Joseph Henry Allassani was a Ghanaian teacher and politician. He was a member of parliament and a minister of state during the first republic. He was the first health minister in the first republic of Ghana.

Early life and education
Allassani was born around 1906 at Gumo a suburb of the Kumbungu District about 9 km from Tamale in the Northern Region, Ghana then a territory of Togoland under the trusteeship of the United Kingdom. He had his elementary education at catholic schools in Tamale, Elmina, Sunyani, and finally at St. Peter's school in Kumasi. He entered the Government Teacher Training College in 1924 and graduated with his Certificate 'A' in 1926.

Career and politics
Allassani begun teaching in 1927 at St. Peter's Roman Catholic School, Kumasi. He taught there for about twenty-two years. In 1949 he resigned to take up an appointment as secretary to the Dagomba Native Administration. That same year, he was elected into the Northern Territories Council and in 1951 he was elected to the legislative assembly as a representative of Dagomba East on the ticket of the Convention People's Party. He officially took office on 8 February 1951. On 1 April 1951, he was appointed ministerial secretary (deputy minister) to the ministry of development and on 20 June 1954 he was appointed Minister for Education, officially taking office on 21 June that year. In 1955 and 1956 he argued for the integration of Northern Togoland with the Gold Coast before the Trusteeship Council of the United Nations. He was appointed minister for health in June 1956 until September 1959 when he was appointed Ghana's Resident Minister in Guinea. He held that office until 30 June 1960 when he was appointed chairman of Rural Housing officially taking office on republic day; 1 July 1960. He served in this capacity until 1 January when he was appointed chairman of the State Paints Corporation. He held this office until February 1966 when the Nkrumah government was overthrown. During his tenure of office as a government official, he served on various boards and committees, some which include; the Scholarship Selection Board, the Central Tender Board, the Erzuah Committee on Civil Service Salaries and the Committee on Transport in the Northern Territories. During the era of the National Liberation Council government he was sentenced to 3 months imprisonment with hard labour by two asset commissions on the conviction of perjury and contempt of Justice Apaloo's Commission.

Personal life
Allassani was married to Susana Andani with whom he had twelve children. He enjoyed listening to music.

See also
Nkrumah government
Minister for Health (Ghana)
 List of MLAs elected in the 1954 Gold Coast legislative election
 List of MLAs elected in the 1956 Gold Coast legislative election
 List of MPs elected in the 1965 Ghanaian parliamentary election

References

Date of death missing
Place of death missing
Ghanaian MPs 1951–1954
Ghanaian MPs 1954–1956
Ghanaian MPs 1956–1965
Ghanaian MPs 1965–1966
Education ministers of Ghana
Health ministers of Ghana
Convention People's Party (Ghana) politicians
20th-century Ghanaian politicians
Year of birth uncertain
1906 births